Meredith Hay is an American academic and biomedical researcher.  She currently serves as Professor of Physiology, College of Medicine, Professor in the Evelyn F. McKnight Brain Institute and Professor in the Department of Psychology at University Arizona.

Dr. Hay is currently President and founder of a Tucson biotechnology company, ProNeurogen, Inc. ProNeurogen www.proneurogen.com  is a preclinical and clinical stage biopharmaceutical company developing novel peptide based therapeutics to treat vascular dementia and cognitive impairment caused by inflammation and cardiac disease.

In February 2008, Hay was named Executive Vice President and Provost at the University of Arizona. In this role Dr. Hay served as the UA's chief operating officer with responsibilities for the entire university budget. Following her tenure as Provost at the University of Arizona, she was asked to serve as Special Advisor to the Chairman of The Arizona Board of Regents.

From 2005 to 2008, Dr. Hay served as the Vice President for Research at the University of Iowa . At the University of Iowa, Dr. Hay provided the central leadership for all of the university's research, scholarly, and creative programs, including the academic medical center. Dr. Hay served as a spokesperson for the university, working closely with state and federal government leaders, private sector representatives, and local community groups to broaden both private and public support for the university.   She led a significant reorganization of the university's economic development efforts, with a focus on improving public access to the University, enhancing the University's technology licensing and commercialization activities, and creating better opportunities for new University-initiated small business start-ups.

In November 2016, Dr. Hay was elected to the Governing Board of Pima Community College and served as vice- chair of the board from 2019-2021.

Dr. Hay, a Texas native, earned her B.A. in psychology from the University of Colorado, Denver, and her M.S. in neurobiology from the University of Texas at San Antonio, and her Ph.D. in cardiovascular pharmacology from the University of Texas Health Sciences Center, San Antonio. She trained as a postdoctoral fellow in the Cardiovascular Center at the University of Iowa College of Medicine and at Baylor College of Medicine in Houston. Prior to joining the faculty at the University of Missouri-Columbia in 1996, she was a faculty member in the Department of Physiology at the University of Texas Health Science Center-San Antonio.

Academic career
Dr. Hay, a tenured professor at the UA College of Medicine, is a leading expert in gender physiology and the differences in males and females in neurocontrol of the cardiovascular system.

Dr. Hay is a native of Houston, Texas.  She earned her B.A. in psychology from the University of Colorado Denver, and her M.S. in neurobiology from the University of Texas at San Antonio, and her Ph.D. in cardiovascular pharmacology from the University of Texas Health Science Center at San Antonio.

Prior to joining the University of Arizona, Dr. Hay was at The University of Iowa in Iowa City, Iowa.

External links
https://meredithhaylab.arizona.edu/
https://www.physiology.org/publications/news/the-physiologist-magazine/2019/july-promotions/in-her-hay-day?SSO=Y

Provost Hay speaks about leading UA in Difficult Climate

References

University of Colorado Denver alumni
University of Texas at San Antonio alumni
University of Iowa faculty
University of Arizona faculty
Living people
American chief operating officers
Year of birth missing (living people)